Cobubatha is a genus of moths of the family Noctuidae. It was erected by Francis Walker in 1863.

Species
 Cobubatha albiciliatus Smith, 1903
 Cobubatha dissociata Dyar, 1912
 Cobubatha dividua Grote, 1879
 Cobubatha hippotes Druce, 1889
 Cobubatha inveterata Dyar, 1914
 Cobubatha ipilla Dyar, 1916 (syn: Cobubatha rustica Dyar, 1918)
 Cobubatha lixiva Grote, 1882 (syn: Cobubatha basicinerea Grote, 1882, Cobubatha lixinites Dyar, 1912)
 Cobubatha megaplaga Dyar, 1912
 Cobubatha melor Dyar, 1912
 Cobubatha melorista Dyar, 1912
 Cobubatha metaspilaris Walker, 1863 (syn: Cobubatha punctifinis Hampson, 1910)
 Cobubatha numa Druce, 1889
 Cobubatha ochrocraspis Hampson, 1910
 Cobubatha orthozona Hampson, 1910 (syn: Cobubatha antonita Dyar, 1911, Cobubatha victrix Dyar, 1912)
 Cobubatha plumbifusa Dyar, 1912

References

Acontiinae